Betty Butler may refer to:

Betty Butler, founder of Circus Juventas
Betty Butler, see College Bowl
Betty Butler, station manager of WTLS
List of DC Comics characters: B, Betty Butler

See also
Elizabeth Butler (disambiguation)